dineLA's Restaurant Week is a consecutive 12-day event that takes place bi-annually in the summer and the winter. Hundreds of fine dining restaurants in Los Angeles, California, participate in this showcase of cultural diversity as they offer prix fixe meals to locals and tourists alike for a fraction of their normal prices. The dining experiences vary from "quaint and kitschy to red-carpet treatment" and offer an array of choices to choose from. This event encourages diners to experience new places that they never would have gotten the chance to try otherwise.

History
dineLA is a marketing association run by the Los Angeles Tourism and Convention Board and American Express in an attempt to accentuate Los Angeles as a prime dining location. First introduced to Los Angeles County in January 2008, dineLA's Restaurant Week featured over 140 different restaurants. Now in 2014, dineLA's Restaurant Week has partnered with over 300 restaurants from all over the county. This event was successful in its endeavors to promote all the levels of fine dining through different ethnic palettes.

Previous restaurant weeks include:

January 27, 2008 – February 8, 2008
January 21, 2009 – February 1, 2009
October 4, 2009 – October 16, 2009
January 24, 2010 – February 5, 2010
October 3, 2010 – October 15, 2010
January 23, 2011 – February 4, 2011
October 2, 2011 – October 14, 2011
January 22, 2012 – Feb 3, 2012
July 16, 2012 – July 27, 2012
January 21, 2013 – February 1, 2013
July 15, 2013 – July 26, 2013
January 20, 2014 – January 31, 2014
January 18, 2016 – January 31, 2016
January 12, 2018 – January 26, 2018

References

Festivals in Los Angeles